The canton of Brionne is an administrative division of the Eure department, northern France. Its borders were modified at the French canton reorganisation which came into effect in March 2015. Its seat is in Brionne.

It consists of the following communes:

Aclou
Barc
Barquet
Beaumontel
Beaumont-le-Roger
Le Bec-Hellouin
Berthouville
Berville-la-Campagne
Boisney
Bosrobert
Bray
Brétigny
Brionne
Calleville
Combon
Écardenville-la-Campagne
Franqueville
Goupil-Othon
Grosley-sur-Risle
Harcourt
La Haye-de-Calleville
Hecmanville
La Houssaye
Launay
Livet-sur-Authou
Malleville-sur-le-Bec
Morsan
Nassandres sur Risle
La Neuville-du-Bosc
Neuville-sur-Authou
Notre-Dame-d'Épine
Le Plessis-Sainte-Opportune
Romilly-la-Puthenaye
Rouge-Perriers
Saint-Cyr-de-Salerne
Saint-Éloi-de-Fourques
Sainte-Opportune-du-Bosc
Saint-Paul-de-Fourques
Saint-Pierre-de-Salerne
Saint-Victor-d'Épine
Thibouville

References

Cantons of Eure